Sarah Dix Hamlin (November 27, 1844August 25, 1923) was a 19th-century American educator, principal, founder and owner of the Hamlin School for girls in San Francisco.

Early life

Sarah Dix Hamlin was born in Westford, Massachusetts on November 27, 1844. She was the daughter of Cyrus Hamlin (1815-1899) and Dinah Ann Cartelyou (1820-1891). In 1859, Hamlin graduated from Westford Academy at age 15. In 1860, Hamlin moved to Block Island, near Rhode Island to teach. In 1870, Hamlin was accepted to University of Michigan. She was the first female student accepted to Michigan. She graduated in 1874.

Career

From 1875 to 1877, Hamlin taught at the Detroit High School in Michigan. In 1877, Hamlin moved to Nevada as a tutor for students in a mining camp near Cherry Creek, Nevada. In 1879, she moved to San Francisco to teach. She moved to Franklin Street in 1885 and then to Van Ness Avenue in 1866. Hamlin founded and was the charter member of the Century Club of California in 1888. In 1889, Hamlin was sent to India, by the Ramabai Association of America, to help establish a school for child windows. Pandita Ramabai was the leading advocate for women's rights & education of women in India.

In 1891, Hamlin founded the San Francisco branch of the American Association of University Women, the second oldest in the country. In 1893, Hamlin tutored Alice B. Toklas, a member of the Parisian Avant-garde and the life partner of American writer Gertrude Stein. She was one of four women members of the San Francisco chamber of commerce.

In April 1896 Hamlin purchased the Van Ness Seminary School located at 1849 Jackson Street, San Francisco. The school was renamed Miss Hamlin's School for Girls in 1898.

After the San Francisco earthquake in 1906, Hamlin moved the school to a mansion located at 2230 Pacific Avenue in San Francisco. In 1915, Hamlin held classes at 2119 and 2123 Broadway Street, San Francisco. In 1928, Hamlin School moved to its present location, a three-story Italian Baroque Revival mansion at 2120 Broadway in San Francisco.

Death

On August 25, 1923, the Hamlin school founder, Sarah Dix Hamlin died in San Francisco after a short illness. She was a member of the Grace Cathedral where funeral services were held on August 28. She was cremated and buried at Fairview Cemetery in Westford, Massachusetts. Her sister, Catherine "Kate" Hamlin (1847-1937) operated the Hamlin School after Sarah's death.

Publications

Legacy
The Hamlin School still operates today as a private day school for girls in Kindergarten through eighth grade. It is the oldest nonsectarian, independent, day school for girls in the Western United States.

External links
The Hamlin School official website
Sarah Dix Hamlin

References

 

People from Massachusetts
People from San Francisco
1844 births
1923 deaths
University of Michigan alumni